The dancing priest may refer to:
Neil Horan, former Roman Catholic priest notorious for interrupting sporting events
Fr. Liam Finnegan, fictional character from the sitcom Father Ted